In mathematics, the lamplighter group L of group theory is the restricted wreath product

Introduction 

an infinite direct sum of copies of the cyclic group  where  corresponds to a light that is off and  corresponds to a light that is on, and the direct sum is used to ensure that only finitely many lights are on at once.

There are two generators for the group: the generator t increments k, so that the lamplighter moves to the next lamp (t -1 decrements k), while the generator a means that the state of lamp lk is changed (from off to on or from on to off.) Group multiplication is done by "following" these operations. 

We may assume that only finitely many lamps are lit at any time, since the action of any element of L changes at most finitely many lamps.  The number of lamps lit is, however, unbounded.  The group action is thus similar to the action of a Turing machine in two ways. The Turing machine has unbounded memory, but has only used a finite amount of memory at any given time. Moreover, the Turing machine's head is analogous to the lamplighter.

Presentation 
The standard presentation for the lamplighter group arises from the wreath product structure

, which may be simplified to
.

The generators a and t are intrinsic to the group's notable growth rate, though they are sometimes replaced with a and at, changing the logarithm of the growth rate by at most a factor of 2. 

This presentation is not finite (it has infinitely many relations). In fact there is no finite presentation for the lamplighter group, that is, it is not finitely presented.

Matrix representation 
Allowing  to be a formal variable, the lamplighter group  is isomorphic to the group of matrices

where  and  ranges over all polynomials in 

Using the presentations above, the isomorphism is given by

Generalizations 
The classical lamplighter group is recovered when

References

Further reading
 Volodymyr Nekrashevych, 2005, Self-Similar Groups, Mathematical Surveys and Monographs v. 117, American Mathematical Society, .

Solvable groups